Michael Sid Canales (born June 21, 1961) is an American college football coach and former player. He was the offensive coordinator and quarterbacks coach for the University of North Texas, a position he held from 2010 to 2015. He became the interim head coach of the Mean Green twice, after the firing of Todd Dodge in 2010 and Dan McCarney in 2015. After a brief stint with Utah State in 2016, he was named the Quarterbacks Coach at the University of Tennessee in January 2017, reuniting with Offensive Coordinator Larry Scott, with whom he worked while at the University of South Florida. From 2018 until 2020, Canales was the offensive coordinator at the University of Texas at El Paso.

Canales attended Utah State University, where he was a three-year starting quarterback on the football team.

Coaching career
During the 2010 season at North Texas, he was promoted from offensive coordinator to interim head coach after the mid-season termination of his predecessor, Todd Dodge. North Texas averaged 33.8 points a game after Canales took over as head coach, after averaging 16.9 points in the first seven games of the season. Canales amassed a 2–3 record as the interim head coach of the Mean Green.

Despite North Texas players' support for Canales, the full-time head coaching position was awarded to former Iowa State head coach Dan McCarney.  McCarney retained Canales as offensive coordinator. 

Canales took over again on an interim basis after McCarney was fired five games into the 2015 season, a stretch in which North Texas went 0-5. Following a 1-6 record in his second interim tenure, and athletic director Rick Villarreal announced Canales wouldn't return in any facet for the 2016 season.

On January 19, 2017, Canales was hired as the quarterbacks coach at the University of Tennessee.

Head coaching record

Notes

References

External links
Coaching statistics at Sports-Reference.com
Tennessee Volunteers bio

1961 births
Living people
American football quarterbacks
Arizona Wildcats football coaches
BYU Cougars football coaches
NC State Wolfpack football coaches
New York Jets coaches
North Texas Mean Green football coaches
Pacific Tigers football coaches
People from Coronado, California
Players of American football from California
South Florida Bulls football coaches
Sportspeople from San Diego County, California
Snow Badgers football coaches
Tennessee Volunteers football coaches
Utah State Aggies football coaches
Utah State Aggies football players
UTEP Miners football coaches